XOM is a XML document object model for processing XML with Java that strives for correctness and simplicity.

External links
 Design Principles and XOM: A Conversation with Elliotte Rusty Harold by Bill Venners, July 28, 2003
 XOM Home Page
 XOM Sample Code
 XOM Tutorial
 XOM API

Document Object Model
XML-based standards